Palpita nigricollis is a moth in the family Crambidae. It is found in Thailand, Cambodia, West Malaysia, Sumatra, Bali, Borneo, Java, Philippines, and Sulawesi. Lowland to montane forests (1400m).

References

Palpita
Moths described in 1895
Moths of Asia